Lathone Collie-Minns (born March 10, 1994) is a Bahamian triple jumper. Lathone won the bronze medal at the 2011 World Youth Championships in Lille, France. Collie-Minns competed at the 2019 World Athletics Championships in Doha. Lathone competed for Texas A&M University.

Collie-Minns has a twin brother named Latario Collie-Minns, who he finished behind for bronze medal in the triple jump at the 2011 World Youth Championships.

References

External links
 World Athletics
 World Champ Interview 2019

Bahamian male triple jumpers
Living people
Sportspeople from Nassau, Bahamas
1994 births
World Athletics Championships athletes for the Bahamas
Athletes (track and field) at the 2019 Pan American Games
Pan American Games competitors for the Bahamas